Barking Water is a 2009 independent feature film written and directed by Sterlin Harjo that premiered at the 2009 Sundance Film Festival.  Harjo's second feature film, it stars Richard Ray Whitman, Casey Camp-Horinek, Jon Proudstar, Aaron Riggs, Laura Spencer, Quese iMC, Ryan Red Corn, and Beau Harjo.

The film portrays a road trip by a dying man and his former lover across Oklahoma to visit friends and family, including his daughter and granddaughter in Wewoka, the capital of the Seminole Nation.

Barking Water was named best drama film at the 2009  American Indian Film Festival, and Casey Camp-Horinek was named best actress.

References

External links
 
 
 

2009 films
2009 independent films
American independent films
Films about Native Americans
Films by indigenous directors
Films set in Oklahoma
Films shot in Oklahoma
2000s English-language films
2000s American films